Exoprosopa dorcadion is a species of bee flies in the family Bombyliidae.

Similar species
On the wing of Exoprosopa dorcadion, the black mark on its leading edge near the wingtip ends before the outermost vein. The mark on Exoprosopa caliptera extends to outermost vein. The wing trailing edge of Exoprosopa divisa, Exoprosopa doris, and Exoprosopa eremita is clear.

References

Further reading

External links

 Diptera.info

Bombyliidae
Insects described in 1877